The Royal Belgian Handball Federation (RBHF) ( (KBHB),  (URBH),  (KBHV)) is the governing body of handball and beach handball in Kingdom of Belgium. Founded in 1956, the RBHF is affiliated to the International Handball Federation and European Handball Federation. RBHF is also affiliated to the Belgian Olympic Committee. It is based in Ans. and Halen.

URBH Competitions
 BENE-League Handball
 Belgian Men's 1st Division
 Belgian Women's 1st Division

National teams
 Belgium men's national handball team
 Belgium men's national junior handball team
 Belgium men's national youth handball team
 Belgium women's national handball team
 Belgium women's national junior handball team
 Belgium women's national youth handball team

References

External links
 Official website 
 Official website 
 Royal Belgian Handball Federation at IHF site

Members
1956 establishments in Belgium
Handball
Sports organizations established in 1956
Handball governing bodies